Mike Dee is an American sports and media executive who is currently president of Sports for Audacy, Inc. (formerly known as Entercom), the largest audio rights holder of professional teams and sports talk radio in the United States.  He is the former chief executive officer of the San Diego Padres of Major League Baseball and the Miami Dolphins of the National Football League.  Dee also served as the chief operating officer of the Boston Red Sox and as president of Fenway Sports Group.  While with the Red Sox, the team won two World Series titles.

Early life and college
A native of Baltimore Maryland, Dee grew up an avid fan of the Baltimore Orioles, Baltimore Colts, Washington Bullets (Wizards), and University of Maryland Basketball.  Earning a degree in Government from Franklin and Marshall College (F&M) in Lancaster, Pennsylvania, Dee also played collegiate basketball and is a member of Sigma Pi fraternity.

Executive career

San Diego Padres (1995–2002)
Dee joined the San Diego Padres in 1995 as the director of corporate development, and was promoted to senior vice president of business affairs, working under one of his mentors, Larry Lucchino in 1999, remaining with them until 2002. He assisted in the financial planning and construction of Petco Park and worked to fortify the Padres' business and military partnerships within the community. Dee also led the creation of a new Regional Sports Network in partnership with Cox Communications – Channel 4 Padres.

Boston Red Sox (2002–2009)
When Lucchino joined the John W. Henry and Tom Werner led ownership purchase of the Boston Red Sox in 2002, Dee followed him to Boston, along with 16 other Padres executives including Chicago Cubs president of baseball operations Theo Epstein and current Red Sox CEO, Sam Kennedy.  Dee reached the position of chief operating officer, and under his leadership, the Red Sox set new franchise revenue and attendance records each year of Dee's time with the club, including an MLB-record sellout streak that began in 2003. They also won two World Series, breaking an 86-year drought.

In 2004, Dee turned down an offer to become president of the Los Angeles Dodgers to take on an expanded role with the Red Sox, which included becoming president of Fenway Sports Group (FSG), a sports marketing and investment entity conceived with John W. Henry to diversify and expand Red Sox' business interests beyond Major League Baseball. Today, FSG is the parent company of the Red Sox and Liverpool F.C. of the Premier League. Among the initiatives Dee was responsible for, he spearheaded the acquisition of a 50% interest in Roush Racing, which became Roush Fenway Racing. Dee was in victory lane alongside his partner, the legendary Jack Roush, when Matt Kenseth captured Roush Fenway's first Daytona 500 win in February, 2009.

Under Dee's leadership and vision, FSG became the new paradigm in professional sports of teams diversifying their interests into other sports and related adjacent ventures.  In the early years, FSG's rapid growth was driven by an all-star management team built by Dee, which included Kennedy, current PGA Tour Commissioner, Jay Monahan, and current Chief Commercial Officer of Liverpool F.C., Billy Hogan.

Dee also oversaw the new revenue streams created by the eight-year remodeling of Fenway Park and the surrounding neighborhood.  Just prior to his departure in 2009, he consummated a $78 Million, thirty-year agreement with Lee County, Florida for a publicly funded spring training complex, known today as JetBlue Park.  In addition, Dee consummated a record 10-year radio partnership with Entercom Communications, establishing a key relationship with CEO, David Field, in 2005.

Dee's successful tenure with the Red Sox and Fenway Sports Group concluded in May 2009, when he was offered the role of CEO of the Miami Dolphins.

Miami Dolphins (2009–2013)
Dee served as the CEO of the Miami Dolphins and Sun Life Stadium from 2009 through 2013, handpicked by then new Dolphins Owner, Stephen M. Ross. Dee brokered the stadium naming-rights deal with Sun Life Financial that became the site of major events such as Super Bowl XLIV, 2013 College Football National Championship Game, four Orange Bowls, and WrestleMania XXVIII.  He also negotiated a deal with Miami-Dade County for a partial publicly funded renovation of the stadium in 2013.  The high-profile campaign that followed died on the floor of the Florida House of Representatives after being unanimously approved by the Florida State Senate.

Dee embraced former Dolphins players and elevated the alumni involvement with the team, by promoting former Dolphin icon Nat Moore to the role of senior vice president & special advisor to the CEO.  With the alumni support, Dee started the Dolphins Cycling Challenge in honor of former Dolphin Jim Mandich, benefiting the University of Miami Sylvester Cancer Center which has become the largest athletic fundraiser in the State of Florida.  Dee left the Dolphins in July, 2013 to become the President & CEO of the San Diego Padres.

San Diego Padres (2013–2016)
On July 17, 2013, the San Diego Padres hired Dee to serve as team President and Chief Executive Officer.  During his tenure, Dee led the Club to significant revenue growth, had oversight of a multi-year renovation to Petco Park that saw it be named as the #1 Ballpark in Major League Baseball, and was responsible for the Club's successful bid to host the 2016 Major League Baseball All-Star Game.

With direct responsibility for baseball operations for the first time in his two decades in baseball, Dee took over a franchise that had been in the midst of five horrific losing seasons prior to his arrival and designed a long-term rebuild.  This began with his hiring of A.J. Preller as the team's GM in 2014, a controversial pick in the eyes of many. By the time Dee left the team in 2016, the Padres minor league system had improved from the bottom third of MLB teams to being considered one of the top two, a process that included the acquisitions of top prospects Fernando Tatis Jr. and Chris Paddack through trades, as well as a $90M+ investment in the international free agent pool of 2016.  This transformation was the foundation for the present day Padres of the 2020s where veterans Eric Hosmer and Manny Machado have been added to this young core (post Dee's tenure) to position the franchise for a successful decade.

On October 12, 2016, it was announced that the San Diego Padres and Dee had parted ways

Audacy, Inc. (2017–present)
On May 2, 2017, Dee joined Audacy (formerly Entercom Communications), as President of Sports with responsibility for "elevating [the company's] position as a leading sports media partner in support of the company’s expansive suite of local sports radio stations and personalities and sports play-by-play relationships," according to a company press release.  Dee joined Audacy after CEO David Field recruited him upon the merger with CBS radio in 2017 to create the largest audio sports platform in the country.  In his role, Dee oversees over forty play-by-play relationships across the major professional sports along with two dozen Power-5 Conference NCAA play-by-play relationships, including the Boston Red Sox, Kansas City Chiefs, Philadelphia Eagles, University of Oregon and Clemson University.

At Audacy, Dee is responsible for the launch of RADIO.COM Sports, a fully integrated digital audio platform for all of its sports content.

Dee also spearheads the company's sports betting strategy since legalization started across various markets in 2017.  This includes significant partnerships with FanDuel, BetMGM, Rush Street Interactive, and The Action Network.  In October 2020, Dee lead the Audacy team in consummating what was reported as the largest single advertising partnership in the history of the radio/audio industry with FanDuel and their agency, Ad Results Media.  Dee also played a lead role in Audacy's acquisition of the QL Gaming Group – a digital sports betting data analytics platform – and their app BetQL.

Personal
Dee is married to Karen, and they have two sons, Spencer and Tommy. Dee is a golf and paddleboard enthusiast.  He is also an avid cyclist participating in the Pan-Mass Challenge, in addition to serving on its board. The nation's largest athletic fundraiser, Pan-Mass has raised more than $700 million for cancer research.

References

Living people
Miami Dolphins executives
San Diego Padres executives
Boston Red Sox executives
Franklin & Marshall Diplomats men's basketball players
American chief operating officers
American chief executives of professional sports organizations
American men's basketball players
Year of birth missing (living people)